Bessé is a commune in the Charente department in southwestern France.

Population
The inhabitants of Bessé-sur-Braye are called Besséens.

See also
Communes of the Charente department

References

Communes of Charente